Barnweill Castle was a castle located at Barnweill, in the parish of Craigie, South Ayrshire, Scotland.

The castle was a stronghold of the Lindsay family. A rectangular moat is located around the motte, the caput of the Barony of Barnweill.

References
CANMORE - Barnweill

Castles in South Ayrshire
Listed castles in Scotland
Clan Lindsay